Vladimir Andreyevich Konstantinov (born November 19, 1956) is a Crimean and Russian politician who has served as the Chairman of the State Council of the Republic of Crimea since 17 March 2014.

He served as Chairman of the Supreme Council in the Autonomous Republic of Crimea from 17 March 2010 until 17 March 2014.
On March 5, 2014, the Shevchenko District Court of Kyiv ruled on the detention of the self-proclaimed leaders Sergey Aksyonov and Vladimir Konstantinov. The Security Service of Ukraine was charged to bring them to court. On March 15, 2014 Ukrainian parliament dissolved the Supreme Council of Crimea.

In 2012, Konstantinov strongly condemned calls for an incorporation of Crimea into Russia. On 20 February 2014, during a visit to Moscow, he stated that the 1954 transfer of Crimea from the Russian Soviet Federative Socialist Republic to the Ukrainian Soviet Socialist Republic had been a mistake. Since March 2014, Konstantinov is a strong supporter of the 2014 Russian annexation of Crimea.

Biography 
He was born in Vladimirovca in the Moldavian SSR (present-day Moldova/Transnistria) on November 19, 1956. In 1973, he graduated from Nauchnenskaya secondary school of Bakhchysarai Raion. He is a graduate of Simferopol branch of Sevastopol instrument-making institute, majoring in industrial and civil engineering. From 1979 to 1981 he served in the military service in the Armed Forces of USSR. He holds numerous awards and merits including the "Honored Builder of Ukraine".

Political career 
He served as Deputy of the Supreme Council of the Autonomous Republic of Crimea 1998–2002.

Alleged criminal involvement 
Andriy Senchenko, member of the Verkhovna Rada (Supreme Council of Ukraine) from Batkivshchyna party led by Yulia Tymoshenko, has alleged in March 2014 that Vladimir Konstatinov has been involved in fraudulent real estate transactions and that he has worked since the 1990s with Prime Minister Sergey Aksyonov, who Senchenko alleged to be a member of organized crime.

References

1956 births
Living people
Fugitives wanted by Ukraine
People from Slobozia District
Party of Regions politicians
United Russia politicians
21st-century Russian politicians
People of the annexation of Crimea by the Russian Federation
Pro-government people of the Euromaidan
Recipients of the Order "For Merit to the Fatherland", 1st class
Laureates of the State Prize of Ukraine in the Field of Architecture
Russian individuals subject to European Union sanctions
Russian individuals subject to the U.S. Department of the Treasury sanctions
Specially Designated Nationals and Blocked Persons List